Bloomington is a city and the county seat of McLean County, Illinois, United States. It is adjacent to the town of Normal, and is the more populous of the two principal municipalities of the Bloomington–Normal metropolitan area. The 2020 census showed the city had a population of 78,680, making it the 13th-most populated city in Illinois and the fifth-most populous outside the Chicago Metropolitan Area. Combined with Normal, the twin cities have a population of roughly 130,000. The Bloomington area is home to Illinois Wesleyan University and Illinois State University. It also serves as the headquarters for State Farm Insurance and Country Financial.

Geography

Climate and weather

History

The Bloomington area was at the edge of a large grove occupied by the Kickapoo people before the first Euro-American settlers arrived in the early 1820s. Springing from the settlement of Keg Grove, later called Blooming Grove, Bloomington was named as county seat on December 25, 1830, when McLean County was created.

When the County of McLean was incorporated, a county seat was established, but the legislation stated the site of Bloomington "would be located later." James Allin, one of the new county's promoters, offered to donate  of his land for the new town. His offer was accepted, and Bloomington was laid out. Its lots were sold at a well-attended and noisy auction on July 4, 1831. At this time there were few roads, but rich soils brought new farmers who began commerce by conducting their business in the county. People came from all over to trade and do business at the town's center, known today as Downtown Bloomington, including Abraham Lincoln, who worked as a lawyer in nearby Springfield. Prominent Bloomington resident Jesse W. Fell, who founded the Bloomington Pantagraph and was most prominent in local real estate, had suggested the Lincoln-Douglas debates in 1854 and played a prominent role in pushing Lincoln to run for president.

In 1900, an officer on patrol discovered a fire in a laundry across the street from the old city hall and police station. He sounded the alarm but the fire destroyed most the downtown, especially the areas north and east of the courthouse. The burnt area was quickly rebuilt from the designs of local architects George Miller and Paul O. Moratz.

During the first two decades of the 20th century, Bloomington continued to grow. Agriculture, the construction of highways and railroads, and the growth of the insurance business (mainly State Farm Insurance) all influenced the growth of Bloomington and its downtown. The downtown area became a regional shopping center attracting trade from adjoining counties. Labor unions grew in strength.

In 1997, Judy Markowitz was elected as the city's first female and Jewish mayor. During her two terms as mayor, an arena was built in downtown Bloomington and the city's performing arts center began restoration. Bloomington also approved a gay rights ordinance in 2002. In 2021, Mboka Mwilambwe was elected as the city's first black mayor.

Demographics

As of the census of 2010, there were 76,610 people and 30,454 households within the city. The racial makeup of the city was 77.5% White, 10.1% African American, 0.3% Native American, 7.0% Asian, 1.42% from other races, and 2.9% from two or more races. Hispanic or Latino of any race were 5.6% of the population.

The City of Bloomington and McLean County comprise the fastest-growing metropolitan area in Illinois. The area's population has grown 28% from 1990 through 2006. The fastest growth has been in Bloomington, as the U.S. Census Bureau conducted a special census of that city in February 2006, showing a population of 74,975, a 15.7% increase in less than six years.

In 2010, there were 34,339 households, out of which 28.8% had children under the age of 18 living with them, 46.7% were married couples living together, 9.1% had a female householder with no husband present, and 41.1% were non-families. 32.6% of all households were made up of individuals, and 9.2% had someone living alone who was 65 years of age or older. The average household size was 2.41 and the average family size was 3.12.

In the city, the population was spread out, with 27.3% under the age of 20, 9.0% from 18 to 24, 29.8% from 25 to 45, 23.8% from 45 to 64, and 10.2% who were 65 years of age or older. The median age was 33 years. For every 100 females, there were 95.4 males.

The median income for a household in the city was $58,662, and the median income for a family was $81,166. Males had a median income of $56,597 versus $39,190 for females. The per capita income for the city was $32,672. About 5.7% of families and 11.0% of the population were below the poverty line, including 12.6% of those under age 18 and 6.3% of those age 65 or over.

Economy

Top employers
According to Bloomington's 2018 Comprehensive Annual Financial Report, the area's top employers are:

Bloomington is also home to a convention center at the McLean County Fairgrounds, Grossinger Motors Arena, and Beer Nuts.

Transportation
Interstates 39, 55 and 74 intersect at Bloomington, making the city a substantial transportation hub. US highways 51 and 150 and Illinois state route 9 also run through Bloomington. The legendary highway U.S. Route 66 once ran directly through the city's downtown and later on a bypass to the east. The Bloomington-Normal Public Transit System operates Bloomington-Normal's internal bus system, and several intercity bus lines operate north–south and east–west service through the city.

Bloomington is serviced by passenger rail, bus service, and several airlines.
 Amtrak, from its Bloomington-Normal station, operates five trains in each direction between St. Louis and Chicago each day. The station also serves connecting bus service to Peoria and Amtrak stations in Galesburg and Champaign/Urbana. It is Illinois's second-busiest Amtrak station after Chicago, serving more than 209,000 passengers in fiscal year 2010.
Greyhound Lines provides service to/from Chicago and St. Louis. Burlington Trailways offers service from the Amtrak station and the Greyhound station to/from Peoria, Quad Cities, Illinois/Iowa, Champaign, and Indianapolis
 The Central Illinois Regional Airport on Route 9 is served by four airlines (Delta Air Lines, American Eagle, Frontier and Allegiant Air), five rental car agencies, and has direct daily flights to Atlanta (Delta), Chicago (American Eagle), Dallas-Ft. Worth (American Eagle), Detroit (Delta), and Minneapolis/St. Paul (Delta). Additional service includes nonstop flights to Sanford, Florida (Allegiant) and St.Pete/Clearwater (Allegiant). A record 559,481 passengers flew to or from CIRA in 2010.
 Connect Transit has 11 color-coded fixed routes in the area; a lift-assisted paratransit service called Connect Mobility and a campus shuttle for ISU called Redbird Express.

Attractions

Recreation and entertainment
 The Bloomington Ice Center (Formally known as Pepsi Ice Center) is an indoor public ice skating facility operated by the Bloomington Parks & Recreation Department, featuring a full-size sheet of ice: 200’ x 85’. The facility offers ice skating lessons, public skating sessions, a comprehensive hockey program, learn to curl and curling leagues, skate rental and a concessions stand.
 The Grossinger Motors Arena (formerly the U.S. Cellular Coliseum) in southwest downtown Bloomington opened in 2006 and is home to the Bloomington Edge of the Indoor Football League and formerly the home of the PrairieThunder and Blaze of the Central Hockey League. Since 2014, it is the home rink of the Central Illinois Flying Aces of the United States Hockey League, as well as hosting certain games of Illinois State University's club hockey team and local youth hockey programs. The facility can also be set up as a theatre with a retractable curtain, and enables shows to seat 2,500–5,000 in a more intimate atmosphere. Since the Coliseum's opening, the facility has hosted an array of events including concerts, family shows, ice shows, motorsports and tradeshows.
Bloomington Public Library was first opened in 1857 by the Ladies’ Library Association, which formed in 1856. The small library was mainly supported by book donations and membership fees. In 1871, the library relocated to 105 West North Street (now West Monroe Street). After closing due to a lack of funds in 1880, the library reopened after local residents raised $1,100 to support it. In 1888, the library moved into a new two-story building at the corner of East and Washington streets on land donated by Sarah B. Withers. In honor of the donation, the library was renamed "Withers Library." In 1976, Citizens for a New Public Library organized a Friends of the Library group that campaigned for approval of bonds to raise money for a new public library. The campaign was successful, and in 1977 the library reopened at 205 East Olive Street as Bloomington Public Library. It offers a number of public programs, including a Bookmobile, started in 1926 as Library on Wheels, that delivers to local neighborhoods.

Nature and wildlife
 The Bloomington Parks & Recreation Department is composed of four divisions: Parks, Recreation, Golf, and the Miller Park Zoo. Parks are open from 6:00am to 10:00pm. Alcoholic beverages and smoking are prohibited and pets are allowed on a leash. These facilities often contain water spray parks, elaborate playgrounds, miniature golf, baseball/softball diamonds, soccer fields, cricket grounds, and lighted tennis courts. The Evergreen Racket Club provides indoor tennis courts. Outdoor public swimming pools are at O'Neil Park (west) and Holiday Park (east). The YMCA, YWCA, and private health clubs operate indoor pools.
 Miller Park Zoo offers many exhibits and zookeeper interaction opportunities. Zoo inhabitants include a Sumatran tiger, river otter, Galapagos tortoise, Amur leopard, sun bears, reindeer, sea lion, red pandas, lemus, bald eagles, pallas cats and red wolves. The zoo features many exhibits including Wallaby WalkAbout, ZooLab, Children's Zoo, Animals of Asia, and the Katthoefer Animal Building. The Zoo's newest exhibit is the Tropical America Rainforest.
 The Bloomington-Normal Constitution Trail is a  jogging, walking, cycling, and rollerblading trail that operates on dedicated right-of-way through much of the city. Bridges and tunnels are used to separate the trail from traffic when crossing the busiest streets. The north–south segment of the trail follows the abandoned Illinois Central Gulf (ICG) railroad from Kerrick Road in Normal to Grove Street in Bloomington. The east–west segment intersects the north segment at Normal City Hall Annex and continues east to Towanda-Barnes Road.  The Liberty Branch begins at Commerce Drive and ends at Old Farm Lakes Subdivision. The Freedom Branch begins at Lincoln Street and ends at Route 9 West. Parking is available at adjoining lots throughout the area. The trail is open to walkers, runners, in-line skaters, skateboarders, cyclists, wheelchair users, and other non-motorized forms of transportation. During winter months, it is not cleared of snow, and is available to skiers; weather permitting.
 The Genevieve Green Gardens at Ewing Cultural Center were dedicated in 2007 as part of the Illinois State University's 150th anniversary celebration. Several architects and landscape designers contributed to the extensive project of creating the gardens, including input from Bruce V. Green, an avid gardener whose generous $5.2 million donation spearheaded the project. The gardens include a new public entry that directs visitors to a formal plaza, the entrance to the manor, grass patio, theater walk with a widened walkway and additional plantings.

Golf
In 2005, Golf Digest ranked Bloomington-Normal as the Fifth Best American City for Golf in its "Best in America" Metro Golf Rankings. Golf Digest ranked America's largest Metropolitan Statistical Areas on four different criteria: access to golf, weather, value of golf, and quality of golf.

 The Den at Fox Creek:  , Par 72, 18 holes.

The Den at Fox Creek is a 4-star, Arnold Palmer Signature Designed Golf Course that opened in 1997. Amenities include GPS-equipped carts, club rental, pro shop and snack bar. There are nine holes with water hazards, 131 sand traps and a unique alternative shot closing the 18th hole on this par 72 course. Practice facilities include a large bent grass driving range and tees with practice chipping and putting greens. The Den is home to both the IHSA Boys' Golf State Tournament and State Farm Youth Classic each summer.

 Highland Park Golf Course: , Par 70, 18 holes.
Located in South Bloomington, the Highland Park Golf Course has numerous challenges including creeks, three lakes, well-placed sand traps and tree-lined fairways. Highland Park sports a pro shop, carts, club rental and snack bar and offers individual or group lessons. The Highland Park Golf Course hosts the State Farm Youth Classic each summer.

 The Links at Ireland Grove:  , Par 29, 9 holes.

The Links at Ireland Grove is Bloomington's newest public golf facility and first executive course. This nine-hole course consists of seven par 3's and two par 4's. In addition, The Links Golf Academy offers a  short game practice facility. The Links’ complex also includes Golf Etc., a pro shop selling everything golf related. The Links is also home to the skills Challenge portion of the State Farm Youth Classic each summer.

 Prairie Vista Golf Course:  , Par 72, 18 holes.

Prairie Vista sports 16 water hazards, a wave bunker, two-level greens and fairways, much sand, a pro shop, carts, club rental, snack bar, banquet room and driving range. In addition to annually hosting the State Farm Youth Classic and IHSA Boys' Golf State Finals, Prairie Vista hosted the 1997 NCAA Division I Women's Golf East Regional.

There are two private country clubs within Bloomington: Bloomington Country Club and Lakeside Country Club. A third, Crestwicke Country Club, is just south of the city. All three have golf courses.

Arts and theatre
Bloomington-Normal ranks competitively in Richard Florida's creativity rankings. Most noteworthy is Bloomington-Normal's creative class share of the workforce, which resulted in a No. 1 rating for Bloomington-Normal's creativity rank.

Facilities
 The Bloomington Center for the Performing Arts is the centerpiece of the city's new Cultural District, which also includes the neighboring McLean County of Arts Center, forthcoming festival park, and creativity center for arts education. The center is also home to over twenty area performing arts ensembles.  More than 400 performances and community events take place at the Bloomington Center for the Performing Arts each year.
 The Illinois Symphony Orchestra performs at the Bloomington Center for the Performing Arts, where it gives five Masterworks concerts, two Pops concerts, and three Chamber Orchestra concerts annually.
 The McLean County Arts Center is one of the oldest arts organizations in the Midwest, serving Central Illinois for over 130 years. Each year 12 art exhibitions are held, including the Holiday Treasurers exposition and sale, and the annual Amateur Competition and Exhibition which, for over 70 years, has showcased the best amateur artists in Central Illinois. The Arts Center also sponsors a number of community events, such as the Sugar Creek Arts Festival in Uptown Normal and the Spring Bloom Arts Festival in Bloomington.
 The Community Players Theater, on Robinhood Lane off of Towanda Avenue, is one of the oldest community theaters completely staffed by volunteers. Opened in 1923, it celebrated its 88th season in 2011.
 The Castle Theatre first opened in 1916 as a 1,000-seat theater, created by the legendary theater builders Balaban & Katz, original inventors of the classic movie palace. For decades, the property served as one of the area's premier destinations. The Castle was restored to its former glory with a $1.5 million renovation. It presents live music, corporate, public and private events.
 The Illinois Wesleyan University School of Theatre Arts houses its talent within the Jerome Mirza Theatre at McPherson Hall. Four main stage plays are performed here annually, selected from a playbill including everything from Shakespeare to musicals. McPherson Hall, completed in 1963, is named for IWU's 10th president, Harry W. McPherson, and contains a 300-seat theater, scene shop, classrooms and other facilities.
 The Illinois Wesleyan University Westbrook Auditorium serves approximately 200 music majors and several hundred IWU students each year. Several musical performances of all style periods are featured each semester, and most concerts are free with general seating.
 The Miller Park Outdoor Summer Theatre, an amateur theater group sponsored by the City of Bloomington, performs two major theater productions each year.
 USA Ballet is an international ballet company. It provides children's workshops and outreach programs, and presents at Illinois Wesleyan University's McPherson Theatre three times a year.

Annual events
 American Passion Play is the oldest continuously performed Passion Play in the United States. Performed each spring at the Bloomington Center for the Performing Arts, the Passion Play is set in Palestine and portrays the life of Christ in its entirety.
 The Illinois Shakespeare Festival includes productions performed in an open-air, Elizabethan-style theatre within historic Ewing Manor each summer. The audience is encouraged to picnic on the grounds before each performance to be entertained by strolling Madrigal singers, jesters, and other entertainers as well as a Green Show performance.
 The Lincoln's Bloomington Festival is held each July in Downtown Bloomington and features Civil War reenactments, traditional craft demonstrations, children's activities, musical performances, talks and tours.
 The Spring Bloom Arts Festival is hosted by the McLean County Arts Center in March each year. This indoor fine art festival features over 100 artists representing a wide range of media including woodworking, glass art, sculpture, paintings, prints, photographs and handcrafted jewelry.
 The McLean County Fair is billed as the '"Home of the World's Largest County 4-H Fair" taking place each August at the McLean County Fairgrounds in Bloomington.  4-H activities include: livestock shows, a film festival, and exhibits around food, nutrition & health, plant science, engineering & technology, and environment & natural resources.  Evening Grandstand Entertainment features tractor pulls and various musical acts.

Historic sites
 Ewing Manor was designed by Bloomington architect Phil Hooten in the Channel-Norman style favored by the affluent in the post-Victorian period. The surrounding gardens were created by noted landscape architect Jens Jensen, who also designed Springfield's Lincoln Memorial Gardens. The theatre on the grounds play host to the Illinois Shakespeare Festival each summer.
 The McLean County Museum of History traces its roots back to 1892, the year the McLean County Historical Society was founded. Housed inside the old McLean County Courthouse, the museum features permanent and rotating exhibits that explore the history of Central Illinois. This location is listed on the National Register of Historic Places.

 The Miller Park Pavilion & War Memorial was restored in 1977 and dedicated in May 1988. The black granite memorial is surrounded by red sidewalks that list the names of Central Illinois residents killed or missing in action in the Korean and Vietnam battles.
 The Prairie Aviation Museum has a collection of preserved aircraft on display, including a Bell Sea Cobra, Huey helicopter, and F-14 Tomcat.
 The Evergreen Memorial Cemetery, also known as the Evergreen Cemetery is the burial site of many notable Bloomington-Normal citizens including members of the Stevenson family. Adlai E. Stevenson I, vice president to Grover Cleveland, and Adlai E. Stevenson II, governor of Illinois. ambassador to the United Nations, and twice Democratic candidate for the United States presidency, are both buried there. Also buried there are Stevenson's wife, Letitia Green Stevenson, who was the second National President-General of the Daughters of the American Revolution, and her sister, Julia Green Scott, the seventh National President-General of the Daughters of the American Revolution. Other historical figures buried there include David Davis, friend and mentor to Abraham Lincoln; Charles Radbourn, arguably 19th-century baseball's greatest pitcher; and Dorothy Gage, inspiration for the main character in the Wizard of Oz and niece of author L. Frank Baum.
 The David Davis Mansion offers a glimpse into the life friend and mentor to Abraham Lincoln, David Davis, who served as a United States Supreme Court Justice and was a key component during Lincoln's bid for the 1860 presidential nomination. The Davis Mansion, completed in 1872, combines Italianate and Second Empire architectural features and is a model of mid-Victorian style and taste. His Bloomington home, which remained in the Davis family for three succeeding generations, contains the most modern conveniences of that era: a coal-burning stove, gas lighting and indoor plumbing.  The David Davis Mansion is an historic landmark on the National Register of Historic Places.
 The former building of the Montefiore synagogue is one of the few Moorish Revival buildings in Illinois and one of the oldest synagogues in the United States.
 Other historical landmarks listed on the National Register of Historic Places:
 Rubin Benjamin House
 George H. Cox House
 David Davis III House
 Robert Greenlee House
 John M. Hamilton House
 Holy Trinity Rectory
 McLean County Courthouse
 George H. Miller House
 Miller-Davis Law Building
 Stevenson House
 White Building
 Vrooman Mansion

Tours
Area attractions and businesses also offer a number of tours in Bloomington.

 The Bloomington Center for the Performing Arts offers Behind the Curtain Tours led by a group of specially trained docents. The tours showcase the neo-Classical interior design of the building and explain all of the building's updates and renovations.
 The David Davis Mansion offers tours for both groups and individuals of the 36-room estate of Judge David Davis. Docents use artifacts and stories about the Davis family to interpret the rich social and cultural history of America's western frontier from the 1850s through the 1880s. Specific themes include servant life, domestic life and technology at the dawn of the industrial age, family history (with a focus on children), and Victorian architecture. The mansion is a precursor of the modern homes and comfort systems that we take for granted today, and is a reminder of the role Illinois played in the nation's history when Abraham Lincoln was President. Arrangements can also be made for a special Tea Ladies Inc. program at the mansion.
 The McLean County Museum of History offers an audio driving tour titled Lincoln's Bloomington and Normal, Illinois. The CD-based audio tour presents President Abraham Lincoln as a returning visitor, talking about the places he visited and their meaning. Written and performed by James Keeran, the audio tour includes: Kersey Fell's Law office, where Jesse Fell suggested Lincoln run for the presidency; the home of Asahel Gridley, Lincoln's friend and client in a slander suit; the Miller-Davis Building, where Lincoln practiced law; and 14 other sites.
 The Bloomington-Normal Area Convention and Visitors Bureau offers monthly tours of Bloomington and Normal titled Twin City Tours. Tours depart from the McLean County Museum of History.

Retail
 Eastland Mall is the main shopping center in Bloomington. Featuring food, shopping and entertainment, Eastland Mall contains a variety of stores including Aeropostale, American Eagle Outfitters, Applebee's, Buckle, Finish Line, Limited, Old Navy, Rogers & Hollands, Talbot's, and more, in addition to a number of recreational activities. However, in recent years, the mall has entered into decline in keeping with the general decline of shopping malls across America.
 Downtown Bloomington offers museums, banks, a legal and governmental center, residential living, a large artists' community, plus an assortment of specialty retail businesses and supportive services. There is an abundance of restaurants and a lively night scene.  A number of special events such as Tour de Chocolat, Farmers' Market, Tour de Metro, Pub Crawl, and Once Upon a Holiday, offer a chance to experience the district. Downtown Bloomington is home to government offices of the City of Bloomington, McLean County, and major employers including State Farm Insurance and several specialty stores, bars, restaurants and art galleries.
 Bloomington, Illinois is the only town where Beer Nuts Brand Snacks are made. There are two Beer Nuts Company Stores in Bloomington, each offering a video tour of the Bloomington plant and history of Beer Nuts Brand Snacks.

Sports

Facilities
 The Community Soccer Fields complex offers 20 soccer fields of various sizes used annually by 2,000 area soccer players.
 Extra Innings Bloomington/Normal is an indoor baseball and softball training facility.
 Game Time Gym II is a multi-use indoor facility that can be utilized for soccer, basketball, volleyball, flag football and indoor practice for various other sports.
 The Shira Baseball Complex consists of 6 fields of various sizes (four with lights) and a concession stand to accommodate McLean County baseball players ages 5–19.

Teams

Education

Bloomington is served by two public school districts. The interior of the city is served by Bloomington Public Schools District 87, which operates one high school, Bloomington High School, one junior high school, Bloomington Junior High School, and six elementary schools (Oakland, Washington, Bent, Irving, Sheridan, and Stevenson elementary schools) and one pre-school, Sarah Raymond (named for the first female superintendent for Bloomington).

Growth has taken the city well into the boundaries of a second district, McLean County Unit District No. 5. Although Unit Five originally served only suburban areas, including Normal, the majority of its students now are from Bloomington itself. Unit Five operates two high schools (Normal Community High School and Normal Community West High School), four junior high schools, and numerous elementary schools. As of 2010, Unit Five was constructing its fourth junior high school which is called George Evans Junior High School more commonly known as EJHS. The construction was finished in 2011 Unit 5 was also making two new elementary schools in Bloomington, and is projecting the need for another high school.

Bloomington is also home to several private schools, including Central Catholic High School, Corpus Christi Catholic School Elm./Jr. School, Epiphany Elm./Jr. School, St. Mary's Catholic School, Trinity Lutheran School, and Cornerstone Christian Academy. Bloomington students also may enroll at Metcalf Elm./Jr. School and University High School, laboratory schools located at Illinois State University.

The city of Bloomington is home to one university and one trade school:

 Illinois Wesleyan University, founded in 1850, is a private residential university with an enrollment of 2,100 and a student/faculty ratio of 12 to 1. Historically, it was affiliated with the United Methodist Church. The University consists of the College of Liberal Arts, with 17 academic departments; the College of Fine Arts, comprising professional Schools of Art, Music, and Theatre Arts; and the School of Nursing. In the past decade, Illinois Wesleyan has added the five-story Ames Library, the Center for Natural Science, and the Shirk Center for Athletics and Recreation. An NCAA Division III school, Illinois Wesleyan has had more than 100 athletes elected into the Academic All-American team since 1970.,
 Hairmasters Institute of Cosmetology, Inc. offers classes in pivot point hair sculpture, hair design, long hair design, hair texture, hair color, people skills and salon management instruction.

Neighboring Normal Illinois is home to:
 Illinois State University
 Heartland Community College

Bloomington/Normal Japanese Saturday School (ブルーミントン・ノーマル補習授業校 Burūminton Nōmaru Hoshū Jugyō Kō), a Japanese weekend school, was established in 1986 and held at the Thomas Metcalf School, an ISU laboratory school in Normal. The school has a separate office in Normal.

Notable people

Sister cities
 Normal, Illinois
 Asahikawa, Hokkaido, Japan 
 Caibarién, Cuba
 Canterbury, United Kingdom
 Vladimir, Russia

Media

FM Radio

 88.1 WESN, Illinois Wesleyan University College Radio
 89.1 WGLT, Blues & Jazz (NPR) (HD Radio)
 90.9 WILL-FM, Classical music (RDS) (Urbana-Champaign)
 91.5 WCIC, Christian AC (Peoria)
 92.9 WRPW "Cities 92.9", Talk (RDS)
 93.3 WPBG "93.3 The Drive", Classic Hits (RDS – Artist/Title) (Peoria)
 93.7 WJBC, Country (RDS) (Pontiac)
 95.5 WGLO "95-5 'GLO", Classic Rock (RDS – Artist/Title) (HD Radio) (Peoria)
 96.7 WIHN "Rock 96.7", Active Rock
 97.9 WBBE "97.9 Bob FM", Adult Hits (RDS)
 98.9 W255AI (Translates 91.5 WCIC), Christian AC (RDS) (Peoria)
 99.5 WZIM "Magic 99.5", Adult contemporary (RDS)
 100.1 W261BK (Translates 88.5 WBNH), Religious Music (Pekin)
 100.7 WWHX "Hot 100", Rhythmic CHR (RDS)
 101.5 WBNQ, CHR/Pop (RDS – Artist/Title)
 103.3 WZND-LP Illinois State University Student Radio web (RDS)
 104.1 WBWN "B 104", Country (RDS – Artist/Title) (HD Radio)
 105.7 WIXO "105.7 The X Rocks", Active Rock (RDS – Artist/Title) (Peoria)
 107.7 WIBL "107.7 The Bull", Country (RDS – Artist/Title)

AM Radio
 1230 WJBC, News/Talk

NOAA Weather Radio
 NOAA Weather Radio station KZZ65 transmits from Bloomington and is licensed to NOAA's National Weather Service Central Illinois Weather Forecast Office at Lincoln, broadcasting on a frequency of 162.525 mHz (channel 6 on most newer weather radios, and most SAME weather radios). The station activates the SAME tone alarm feature and a 1050 Hz tone activating older radios (except for AMBER Alerts, using the SAME feature only) for hazardous weather and non-weather warnings and emergencies, along with selected weather watches, for the Illinois counties of McLean, Tazewell, and Woodford. Weather permitting, a tone alarm test of both the SAME and 1050 Hz tone features are conducted every Wednesday between 11 AM and Noon.

Television
 DTV 17-1 WAND-TV NBC (Springfield/Decatur)
 DTV 19-1 WHOI, TBD (formerly ABC) (Peoria-Bloomington)
 DTV 25-1 WEEK-TV NBC (Peoria)
 DTV 25-2 HOI ABC (Peoria)
 DTV 25-3 The CW Peoria/Bloomington
 DTV 31-1 WMBD-TV "Central Illinois Proud", CBS (Peoria)
 DTV 31-2 “Bounce TV” Peoria/Bloomington
 DTV 31-3 “Laff TV”
 DTV 31-4 “Escape”
 DTV 43-1 WYZZ-TV "Central Illinois Proud", Fox (Bloomington)
 DTV 43-3 “getTV” Peoria/Bloomington
 DTV 47-1 WTVP, PBS (Peoria)
 DTV 47-2 PBS Kids (Peoria)
 DTV 59-1 WAOE "My59", MyNetworkTV (Peoria)
 DTV 59-2 “Antenna TV”

Print
 The Pantagraph, local daily newspaper

Notable companies
Bloomington is home to State Farm Insurance., Country Financial, and Beer Nuts. The original Steak 'n Shake restaurant was opened in Normal, Bloomington's adjoining city, in 1934.  It also has the largest Dairy Queen Restaurant.

In popular culture
 A season 4 episode of the Discovery Channel series A Haunting, called The Awakening, takes place in Bloomington in 2003.
 The AWE DLC for the 2019 video game Control, a game about paranormal events and items, contains a haunted train supposedly derailed in Bloomington.
 The character Henry Blake from the show M*A*S*H is from Bloomington.

See also
 Illinois Prairie Community Foundation
 Bloomington, York Region, Ontario – believed to be named for Bloomington in 1869.

References

Further reading

External links

 
 
 
 City Of Bloomington
 The Bloomington-Normal Area Convention and Visitors Bureau Official source of visitor information for the Bloomington-Normal area

 
Cities in Illinois
Cities in McLean County, Illinois
County seats in Illinois

1822 establishments in Illinois
Populated places established in 1822